James T. Genovese (born August 24, 1949) is a justice of the Louisiana Supreme Court, having served since 2017.

Early life and education 

Genovese was born August 24, 1949. He is a lifelong resident of Opelousas, St. Landry Parish, Louisiana. He earned his High school diploma from the Academy of the Immaculate Conception in Opelousas, Louisiana in 1967. He earned a Bachelor of Arts from Northwestern State University in 1971 and a Juris Doctor from Loyola University New Orleans College of Law in 1974.

Legal career 

He has 21 years as a trial attorney in the general practice of law in south Louisiana.

Judicial career 

He began his judicial career began as a judge ad hoc of the Opelousas City Court from 1975 to 1989. He was elected district judge of the Twenty-Seventh Judicial District Court for the Parish of St. Landry in 1995 and served as district judge through 2004, whereupon he was elected to the Louisiana Third Circuit Court of Appeal. He served on the appellate court from 2005 to 2016. He was elected Associate Justice of the Louisiana Supreme Court, commencing January 1, 2017.

In 2016 election, Genovese received 51 percent of the vote, narrowly defeating Judge Marilyn Castle. The Louisiana Secretary of State lists Genovese as a Republican on its election returns but as a registered Independent on the voter portal. He may have switched registration after his election, or one of the party labels may be incorrect.

Personal life 

He is married to his wife Martha Janes. Together they have four daughters and one stepdaughter and four grandchildren.

References

External links
Biography

1949 births
Living people
20th-century American judges
20th-century American lawyers
21st-century American judges
Louisiana lawyers
Justices of the Louisiana Supreme Court
Loyola University New Orleans alumni
Northwestern State University alumni
People from Opelousas, Louisiana